Kristina "Tina" Cook (née Gifford, born 31 August 1970), is a British three-day eventing rider. She is the 2009 European Champion and a three-time Olympic medallist, winning individual and team bronze medals in 2008 and team silver in 2012. She has also won two World team golds (1994, 2010) and four European team golds (1995, 1999, 2009, 2017).

Biography
Cook was born Kristina Gifford in Rustington and is the daughter of the four times British jump racing Champion Jockey, Josh Gifford. Riding Miners Frolic, she won bronze medals in both the individual and team eventing at the 2008 Summer Olympics in Beijing. Cook only made the Olympic Eventing team, after the withdrawals of Zara Phillips and Lucy Wiegersma.  She became double European Eventing champion in 2009 on Miners Frolic in both the Individual and Team competitions at the championships at Fontainebleau in France.

Her achievements prior to the 2008 Olympics included winning individual silver medal at the European championships on Song and Dance Man in 1993, gold medals at the 1994 World Equestrian Games in The Hague and the 1995 and 1999 European Championships.

Cook won silver in the team eventing at the 2012 Summer Olympics in London.
She was then picked for the team in the 2014 World Equestrian Games with her homebred horse De Novo News.  This was the horse's first championship in which they helped to win team silver.

Cook is also patron for the Worthing-based charity, Guild Care.

CCI 5* Results

International Championship results

Notable Horses 

 Captain Christy – 1992 Bay Irish Sport Horse Gelding (Cavalier Royale x Imperious)
 2002 World Equestrian Games – Individual 22nd Place
 2003 European Championships – Individual 37th Place
 Miners Frolic – 1998 Dark Bay Gelding (Miners Lamp)
 2008 Beijing Olympics – Team Bronze Medal, Individual Bronze Medal
 2009 European Championships – Team Gold Medal, Individual Gold Medal
 2010 World Equestrian Games – Team Gold Medal, Individual 29th Place
 2012 London Olympics – Team Silver Medal, Individual Sixth Place
 2013 European Championships – Team Sixth Place, Individual 13th Place
 De Novo News – 2003 Bay Thoroughbred Stallion (Last News)
 2014 World Equestrian Games – Team Silver Medal, Individual 15th Place
 Billy The Red – 2007 Chestnut Baden-Wurttemberger Gelding (Lilith x Stan the Man XX)
 2017 European Championships – Team Gold Medal, Individual Fourth Place

References 

https://web.archive.org/web/20130508081528/http://www.guildcare.org/About-Guild-Care

British event riders
Olympic bronze medallists for Great Britain
Equestrians at the 2008 Summer Olympics
Equestrians at the 2012 Summer Olympics
Olympic equestrians of Great Britain
British female equestrians
1970 births
Living people
Olympic medalists in equestrian
Olympic silver medallists for Great Britain
Medalists at the 2012 Summer Olympics
Medalists at the 2008 Summer Olympics
People educated at Windlesham House School
People from Rustington
People from Findon, West Sussex